Labour's Consultation on Women's Safety, 'Everywoman safe, everywhere' is a UK policy consultation set up by Labour Shadow Home Secretary Yvette Cooper MP in November 2011 and will be chaired by former solicitor general Vera Baird QC supported by Kate Green MP (Shadow Minister for Equalities) and Stella Creasy MP (Shadow Home Office Minister) and will examine the cumulative effects of Coalition Government policy on women's safety, reporting its findings to the Labour Party’s policy making process. The consultation will hold events across the country with local women's groups to examine the impact of the Government's spending and policy changes on women's safety, and will also consider potential legislative measures that could safeguard women’s safety despite the downturn and the lack of available public funds.

Overview 
Chair of the Consultation Vera Baird has said:

Submission of evidence 
The consultation held its first evidence session in London on Monday the 19th of December with ten expert organisations on women's safety giving evidence on the impact of recent Government decisions to their work. As well as calling for evidence to be brought forward at events across the UK, the consultation is also encouraging submissions through its website

Provisional report 
The consultation was due to issue a provisional report by International Women's Day, 8 March 2012.

References

External links 
 The Consultation’s founding document 
 Everywoman Safe Everywhere – Labour's Consultation on Women's Safety website 
 'The coalition does not understand women's safety' – Comment is Free piece in the Guardian on the consultation by Vera Barid QC
 The consultation's Terms of Reference 
 The personal website of Consultation Chair Vera Baird QC

Violence against women in the United Kingdom
Labour Party (UK) publications